WVUM (90.5 FM) is a non-commercial alternative and electronic music college radio station at the University of Miami in Coral Gables, Florida in the United States and broadcasting over-the-air to the Miami metropolitan area and streaming online via Internet radio.

The station is owned by WVUM, Inc., a corporation owned by an advisory board composed of faculty and students at the University of Miami. Air talent and station management are University of Miami students.  Most positions are volunteer but some management positions are paid.

WVUM is the flagship station of Miami Hurricanes sports, airing most events live with color commentary by the station's sports staff. In February 2011, WVUM's Sports Department was invited to be the broadcasters on The University of Miami's web stream broadcasts on hurricanesports.com. The station has been a featured presence at many local Miami arts festivals, including Art Basel in Miami Beach, Ultra Music Festival and Miami Music Week.

Background
WVUM is the noncommercial and fully student-run radio station broadcasting out of the University of Miami. The station was founded in 1967 as a pirate radio station hidden in the Eaton Hall dormitory on the university's campus. WVUM has since evolved into a licensed station with music programming (with a slight electronic bent), public affairs and news content and sports programs.

Licensed to Coral Gables, Florida, WVUM serves the University of Miami and the surrounding communities. The station operates with 5.9 Kilowatts directional and covers most of Miami-Dade county, as well as a stream of programming broadcast worldwide on wvum.org.

History
In 1967, a group of engineering students in Mahoney Hall (a University of Miami dormitory) created an unlicensed transmitter and began operating an illegal radio station. Shortly after being discovered by the FCC, it was requested that they discontinue broadcasting. In order to amend relations, the University of Miami decided to register the station and create what expanded to become WVUM.

So in February 1968, WVUM received its license to broadcast a 10-watt non-commercial, educational radio station (it was barely enough power to be heard throughout the university campus). The station was located on the second floor of the Whitten University Center. The first call letters that was requested by the station to the FCC was WVOH (Voice of Hurricanes), later changed to WIBS (IBIS), which was later changed to and approved by the FCC as WVUM (Voice of the University of Miami). Over the years, the station's power level has increased from 35w ERP to 365w ERP, to 1.3Kw ERP, and finally to its present 5.9Kw ERP directional, away from a second adjacent channel station on 90.9, in the upper Florida keys to the south.

At the time, the radio station was technically licensed by the Mahoney Residence Hall Association, Inc. as early support was provided by them.   In the Spring of 1977, Mahoney Residence Hall Association, Inc changed its name to WVUM, Inc, the title it still holds today.

WVUM offers both rotation and specialty shows. Rotation shows feature recent albums selected by the music directors and Music Staff, while specialty shows focus on a specific genre, style, or concept.

The radio station also offers news, public affairs, and sports programming. WVUM is the flagship station for Miami Hurricanes baseball. It also covers women's volleyball, and basketball and men's football and basketball. The news department produces hourly newscasts, featured news, public service announcements, and community outreach programs.

While WVUM has a corporate and advisory board consisting of staff advisors, the station is student-run by the main decision-making entity: the executive board, which consists of 18 students. The WVUM staff focuses on programming, community involvement, and engaging with Miami's art and music scene. The station's unofficial mascot is Manny the Manatee.

Listeners of WVUM tend to be within the age range of 16 – 49 years old. The station's online stream is well above the average for college radio stations, and receives hits internationally.

WVUM works with many institutions in the Miami music and arts scene. Some of these organizations include but are not limited to: Ultra Music Festival, Sweat Records, MoMA's WPS1 Art Radio, The Electric Pickle, CMJ, Friends With You, Poplife/Grand Central, Nightdrive, FREEGUMS, Museum of Contemporary Art (MOCA), IamYourVillain, Miami Art Museum, The Fillmore, The Vagabond, OHWOW, The Overthrow, Roofless Records, SCOPE Art Fair, WSVA Radio (NYC), and Bardot.

The station has been recognized by both the community and the press, as the Miami New Times’ Reader’s Choice as Best FM Radio Station (2010/2009) and Editor’s Choice Best FM Radio Station (2007/2006), and most recently Best Radio Station (2021). Zoom Out has recognized WVUM as one of the top noncommercial streaming radio stations in the country. In March 2011, the station was awarded mtvU's Woodie Award for "Best College Radio Station".

Expansion
In 1972, WVUM went stereo, and in 1978, the station completely renovated the studio facilities on the second floor of the Whitten University Center. The station would remain there until a larger space downstairs was renovated in 1999, offering two studios and an office.  Previously, this new space had been a barber shop (that went bankrupt in the later 1960s/early 1970s because of the Hippy movement) and a bowling alley motor room. In 2008, for the 40th year of WVUM, IKEA aesthetically renovated the office in the University Center.  The summer of 2015 brought new renovations to WVUM's office, modernizing it and increasing space substantially.

In 1981, the FCC requested all 10-watt stations to increase to at least 100 watts. At that time, WVUM made the necessary arrangements to increase to 365 watts. In 1993, the station expanded to 1,300 watts, and in 2013, to 5,900 watts. In 2000, the station began broadcasting online at wvum.org.

Format changes
University of Miami events and news were the sole programming for WVUM in the 1960s. Community news programming and a top-40 radio format were introduced in the early 1970s, and the station changed to the underground programming in the early 1980s that focused on new wave and punk rock. In the 1990s, the station had a grunge period; today, WVUM's format is largely indie electronic and indie rock genres.

Notable alumni
Dave Aizer, television host and writer
DJ EFN, record executive and deejay
Joshua Johnson, MSNBC host

References

External links

VUM
University of Miami
Radio stations established in 1967
Coral Gables, Florida
1967 establishments in Florida